FabricLive.51 is a 2010 DJ mix album by The Duke Dumont. The album was released as part of the FabricLive Mix Series.

Track listing
  Saturn V - Come into my Life - Spectral Sound / Ghostly International
  Audio Soul Project - Reality Check (Vincenzo Remix) - Dessous Records
  Bodycode - Imitation Dub - Spectral Sound / Ghostly International
  Argy & The Martinez Brothers - Debbie Downer - Objektivity
  Federleicht - On the Streets (Kollektiv Turmstrasse's Let Freedom Ring Remix) - Connaisseur Recordings
  Alessio Mereu & Matteo Spedicati - Attraction - Toys for Boys Records
  Gerd & The House Vectors - We Bring U Muzik - 4lux
  Green Velvet - They came from Outer Space - Relief Records
  Late of the Pier - Bathroom Gurgle (The Duke Dumont Remix) - EMI
  Scuba - Hundreds and Thousands - Hotflush
  Ieyasu Tokugama - Ryozen - WC Recordings
  Floating Points - K&G Beat - Planet Mu Records
  Idioma - Landscapes - Marketing

References

External links
Fabric: FabricLive.51

Fabric (club) albums
2010 compilation albums